Colony Square is a mixed-use development and sub-district in Midtown Atlanta, Georgia, located on Peachtree Street in between 14th and 15th Streets. The oldest high-rise development in Midtown, the sub-district was built between 1969 and 1975, with Henri Jova of Jova/Daniels/Busby serving as principal architect. It was the first mixed-use development in the Southeast.

Designed in modernist style, Colony Square comprises three skyscrapers, two containing offices (Colony Square 100 and Colony Square 400) and one housing a hotel, the W Hotels Atlanta-Midtown. The three skyscrapers are connected by Colony Square Mall, located beneath a sky-lit atrium and offering a food court, ice skating rink, retail, and an athletic club. The original architectural and social concept of Colony Square was the USA's first 'micropolis' - the complex designed for urban professionals to live and work in a common space. Also within the sub-district are three mid-rise condominium buildings (two comprise Colony House and the third, Hanover House). Colony Square also contains street-level restaurants, including 5Church Atlanta, Establishment, Chick-fil-A, Starbucks, and Sukoshi.

North American Properties agreed to terms with Tishman Speyer to purchase the property for $164.5 million in Q4 2015. The deal will include the retail and office space, but not the condominiums and hotel that are part of the complex. North American Properties has major renovation plans for the retail component. The new owner demolished the former mall to create an open green space with a stage surrounded by new shops and a new office building anchored by Whole Foods Market Inc. A second new office building anchored by Jones Day is also being constructed. Upon completion of the redevelopment project, Colony Square will feature 912,000 square feet of office space and 160,000 square feet of shops and entertainment space, including a food hall and IPIC movie theater.

Component buildings
 100 Colony Square, 1175 Peachtree Street NE, 24 floors, opened 1970
 400 Colony Square, 1201 Peachtree Street NE, 22 floors, opened 1975
 W Atlanta-Midtown, 188 14th Street NE, 28 floors, opened 1974
 Hanover House, 147 15th Street, NE
 Colony House, 145 15th Street, NE, 14 floors

Tenants
The Consulate-General of Canada is located in 100 Colony Square Building (Suite 1700), as is the Netherlands Foreign Investment Agency (Suite 1206). WebMD has regional offices located on the top two floors of Colony Square 400.  The complex is also home to the broadcast studios of the Entercom Atlanta (previously called CBS Radio Atlanta before being acquired) stations of WVEE, WZGC, WAOK and WSTR, as well as digital advertising agency Ammunition (Suite 1450).

In 1995 the Consulate-General of Japan in Atlanta was  located in Colony Square. In 2002 the consulate announced it was moving from Colony Square to One Alliance Center. The consulate had over three years left in the lease of Colony Square. Because Trizec Properties owned both office properties, the consulate was easily able to move to its new location.

Coworking companies WeWork and Spaces are located at Colony Square. WeWork occupies five floors at 100 Colony Square. Spaces occupies three floors at 400 Colony Square, including a street-level café.

See also

 Midtown Atlanta

References

External links
 Colony Square

Midtown Atlanta
Mixed-use developments in Georgia (U.S. state)
Neighborhoods in Atlanta
Modernist architecture in Atlanta
Brutalist architecture in Georgia (U.S. state)